Vladimir Krstić (born February 21, 1959 Niš), known by the pseudonym Laci, is an internationally published Serbian comic-book and graphic novel creator, painter and illustrator.

He is known best for his comics series "Billy Wanderer" (1984-1985, written by Miodrag Krstić), "Veliki Blek / Blek le Rok" (1986, written by Petar Aladžić), "Ninja" (1988, written by M. Krstić), "Sherlock Holmes" (2010-, written by Sylvain Cordurié),  "Adam Wild" (2014-2016, written by Gianfranco Manfredi) and Ghosted (2015, written by Joshua Williamson).

He was one of the founders of Association of Comics' Artists of Serbia (Udruženje stripskih umetnika Srbije, USUS) 2010.

Notes

External links
 Laci, ComicBook DB 
 Laci (Vladimir Krstić), bedetheque.com 

1959 births
Living people
People from Niš
Serbian comics artists
Serbian painters